Julio Wais San Martín (August 29, 1878 - April 16, 1954) was a Spanish politician and minister of National Economy during the Dámaso Berenguer period following the dictatorship of Primo de Rivera.

References

Economy and finance ministers of Spain
1878 births
1954 deaths